This is a list of events in Scottish television from 1979.

Events
16 March - The long running American educational series for preschoolers Sesame Street begins airing for the first time on Scottish Television.
3 May - Television coverage of the 1979 general election.
12 July - Garnock Way concludes after three years on air. It is axed to make way for Take the High Road, which would be shown across the ITV network. ITV had rejected Garnock Way because they wanted, in their words, "lots of Scotch Lochs and Hills". The new soap was a bigger budget affair and more in keeping with the 'tartan' perception of Scotland as it was deliberately set in a more beautiful part of Scotland.
Unknown - BBC 1 Scotland airs Can Seo, a 20-part series teaching Scottish Gaelic. Can Seo means "Say This" in Gaelic.
Unknown - Broadcast of the television film A Sense of Freedom about the Glasgow gangster Jimmy Boyle.

Debuts

BBC
13 June - The Omega Factor on BBC 1 (1979)
Unknown - Can Seo on BBC 1 Scotland (1979)

ITV
16 March -  Sesame Street on Scottish Television (1969–present)
Unknown - A Sense of Freedom on Scottish Television (1981)

Television series
Scotsport (1957–2008)
Reporting Scotland (1968–1983; 1984–present)
Top Club (1971–1998)
Scotland Today (1972–2009)
Sportscene (1975–Present)
The Beechgrove Garden (1978–Present)

Ending this year
15 August - The Omega Factor (1979)
Unknown - Garnock Way (1976–1979)

Births
23 January - Dawn Porter, television presenter and writer
28 January - Ainslie Henderson, singer-songwriter
2 February - David Paisley, actor
21 April - James McAvoy, actor

Deaths
9 July - Roddy McMillan, 56, actor and playwright
24 July - Archie Duncan, 65, actor

See also
1979 in Scotland

References

 
Television in Scotland by year
1970s in Scottish television